Sheku Ahmed Tejan Bayoh (30 September 1983 – 3 May 2015) died after being restrained by police in Kirkcaldy, Scotland. His death sparked controversy, and an independent government inquiry following a police investigation.

Life 
Bayoh was born in Sierra Leone. In 1995 he fled to the United Kingdom as an unaccompanied child to escape civil war in Sierra Leone. After living in London for five years, he moved to Fife, Scotland at the invitation of his sister, who had lived there since the 1990s. At the time of his death, Bayoh was training to be a gas engineer. He was a father to two sons.

Death 
On the morning of 3 May 2015, Bayoh visited a friend's house to watch a boxing match on TV. His friends noticed he was acting out of character, which he acknowledged before volunteering to leave the gathering. Bayoh then went to his home, where it is claimed in reports he got a knife and went into the street with it. Concerned neighbours called emergency services to report a black man with a knife acting erratically, and police were dispatched. A number of Police Scotland Constables arrived at the scene where they confronted Bayoh with shouts, pepper spray, and batons before taking him to the ground and cuffing his wrists and ankles. Prior to his restraint, Bayoh assaulted a female officer, PC Nicole Short, striking her in the head. Officers claimed that Bayoh had stamped on PC Short, although three doctors who subsequently examined PC Short could find no evidence of obvious or serious injuries. Bayoh lost consciousness soon after being restrained and police were unable to resuscitate him at the scene; he was pronounced dead in hospital later that morning. A post-mortem report revealed injuries to Bayoh's face, bruising across his body, a fractured rib, and the presence of the street drugs MDMA and Flakka. His cause of death was recorded as 'sudden death in a man intoxicated…[drugs] whilst under restraint.

Investigations

Police investigation 
In the hours following his hospitalisation, the Police Investigations and Review Commissioner (PIRC) began an investigation into the circumstances surrounding Bayoh's death. After 16 months, the PIRC submitted its investigation report to the Lord Advocate James Wolffe for review. In October 2018, the Lord Advocate gave his decision that no criminal, corporate or health and safety charges would be brought against the police involved. In December 2018, Bayoh's family requested a review of the decision after CCTV and mobile phone footage emerged of his encounter with police, which the family felt contradicted police accounts of events. The Lord Advocate upheld his previous decision stating that based on the evidence available, there would be no criminal proceedings against the police.

Independent public inquiry 
In November 2019, the Scottish Government's Justice Secretary Humza Yousaf established an independent public inquiry into Sheku Bayoh's death. Judge Lord Bracadale was appointed as the Inquiry Chairman in January 2020. In May 2020, Yousaf announced the Terms of Reference of the Public Inquiry include establishing the circumstances of Bayoh's death; recommendations that might prevent similar deaths in the future; examination of investigation procedures excluding the Lord Advocate's investigation; whether events surrounding Bayoh's death and actions of the police were influenced by his 'actual or perceived race.' 

In November 2022 Lord Bracadale announced that he envisaged the Inquiry continuing into 2024.

Lament for Sheku Bayoh 
Lament for Sheku Bayoh is a play written by Hannah Lavery. 

It is an artistic response to this tragedy, an expression of grief for the loss of the human behind the headlines and a non-apologetic reflection on identity and racism in Scotland today.

It was originally commissioned and presented as a rehearsed reading by the Lyceum Theatre, supported by the Edinburgh International Festival as part of the 2019 International Festival’s You Are Here strand.

See also
Death of Christopher Alder
Death of Colin Roach
Death of Olaseni Lewis
Death of Oluwashijibomi Lapite
Death of Roger Sylvester
Death of Sean Rigg

References

Deaths in police custody in the United Kingdom